Tosanoides annepatrice is a species of reef fish from the subfamily Anthiinae part of the family Serranidae, the groupers and sea basses. native to the Western Pacific Ocean around Palau and Micronesia and can be found in depths of 115–150 meters. Tosanoides filamentosus is one of six species that make up the genus Tosanoides.

Etymology
The fish is named  in honor of Anne Patrice Greene, the second author's mother.

Description 
It is around 6.9 centimeters long.

References 

Taxa named by Richard Pyle
Taxa named by Brian Greene
Taxa named by Joshua M. Copus
Taxa named by John Ernest Randall 
Fish described in 2018
Fish of the Pacific Ocean
annepatrice